Knut Andreas "Knatten" Lindberg (2 February 1882 – 6 April 1961) was a Swedish athlete who competed at the 1906 Intercalated Games and the 1908 and 1912 Summer Olympics. He had his best results in 1906, when he won a silver medal in javelin throw and finished fifth in ancient pentathlon and sixth in the 100 m race. He won another silver medal in 1912, with the Swedish 4 × 100 m relay team, but failed to reach the finals in all his other events in 1908 and 1912, which included sprint and javelin throw.

Lindberg won 15 national athletics titles: nine over 100 m (1902, 1904–1909, 1911 and 1912); three over 200 m (1908–1909 and 1912) and three over 110 m hurdles (1907–1909). He was also part of the Örgryte IS football team that won the Swedish championships in 1902 and 1904–1907. In 1910 he beat to death a taxi driver, but his defense lawyer managed to lower his sentence to seven months.

References

Further reading

 
 
 

1882 births
1961 deaths
Swedish male sprinters
Olympic athletes of Sweden
Medalists at the 1906 Intercalated Games
Medalists at the 1912 Summer Olympics
Athletes (track and field) at the 1906 Intercalated Games
Athletes (track and field) at the 1908 Summer Olympics
Athletes (track and field) at the 1912 Summer Olympics
Örgryte IS Friidrott athletes
Olympic silver medalists for Sweden
Olympic silver medalists in athletics (track and field)
Swedish people convicted of murder
People convicted of murder by Sweden
Athletes from Gothenburg